The 2021–22 Missouri Valley Conference men's basketball season began with practices in October 2021, followed by the start of the 2021–22 NCAA Division I men's basketball season in November. Conference play began in January 2022 and ended in February.

With a win over Loyola Chicago on February 26, 2022, Northern Iowa clinched the regular season championship. 

The MVC Tournament was held March 3 through March 6, 2022 at Enterprise Center in St. Louis, Missouri. Loyola Chicago won the tournament championship for the second consecutive year, defeating Drake in the championship game.

Northern Iowa point guard A. J. Green was named the conference's player of the year. Northern Iowa coach Ben Jacobson was named conference coach of the year. 

The season was the final season for Loyola Chicago in the conference as they joined the Atlantic 10 Conference on July 1, 2022.

Preseason

Preseason poll 
The preseason awards and coaches' poll was released by the league office on October 20, 2021.

Preseason All-Missouri Valley teams

Source

Regular season

Conference matrix
This table summarizes the head-to-head results between teams in conference play.

Player of the week
Throughout the season, the Missouri Valley Conference named a player of the week and a newcomer of the week each Monday.

Honors and awards

All-Conference awards and teams
The MVC announced its all-conference teams and major playing honors on March 1, 2022, and its Coach of the Year award two days later.

Postseason

MVC Tournament

NCAA Tournament

The winner of the MVC tournament, Loyola Chicago, received the conference's automatic bid to the NCAA Tournament. No other team received a bid to the tournament.

National Invitation Tournament

Northern Iowa, having one the regular season conference, but failed to win its conference tournament, received an automatic bid to the NIT. Missouri State received an at-large bid as well.

College Basketball Invitational

Drake received an invite to the CBI tournament as the No. 1 overall seed.

References

2021–22 Missouri Valley Conference men's basketball season